Italy competed at the 2019 European Athletics Indoor Championships in Glasgow, United Kingdom, from 1 to 3 March 2019 with 27 athletes.

Medalists

Finalists (top eight)

Selected competitors

See also
 Italy national athletics team

References

External links
 EAA official site 

2019
2019 European Athletics Indoor Championships
2019 in Italian sport